A by-election was held for the New South Wales Legislative Assembly electorate of Liverpool on 29 April 1989 because of the resignation of George Paciullo, after being passed over as leader of the party. The Labor pre-selection was the subject of a bitter battle between Mark Latham from the right wing faction and Paul Lynch from the left. Peter Anderson from the right was imposed by the Labor national executive.

Dates

Result				

George Paciullo resigned.

See also
Electoral results for the district of Liverpool
List of New South Wales state by-elections

References

1989 elections in Australia
New South Wales state by-elections
1980s in New South Wales